Horsington may refer to:
 Horsington, Lincolnshire, England
 Horsington, Somerset, England
 Ted Horsington (1878–1947), Australian politician